Walworth is a district of south London, England, within the London Borough of Southwark.

Major streets in Walworth include the Old Kent Road, New Kent Road and Walworth Road.

History
The name Walworth is probably derived from Old English Wealh "Briton" and the suffix -worth "homestead" or "enclosure" and, thus, "British farm".

Walworth appears in the Domesday Book of 1086 as Waleorde. It was held by Bainiard from Archbishop Lanfranc of Canterbury. Its domesday assets were: 3½ hides; one church, four ploughs,  of meadow. It rendered £3.

John Smith House is on Walworth Road, and was renamed in memory of John Smith, who was leader of the Labour Party from 1992 up to his sudden death in 1994. A former headquarters of the Labour Party, it was often seen in news reports at election times and in the background as people came and went from meetings of the Labour Party National Executive Committee. It was used by the London Borough of Southwark as the home for its education department and reopened in July 2012 as a hostel.

St Peter's Church, Walworth, built circa 1825, is an excellent example of the neo-classical style of church built by Sir John Soane. It is an indication of the wealth of the middle-class merchants who then lived in the vicinity that they could afford an architect of such prominence.

Manor Place Baths is a former wash house in Manor Place off Walworth Road. It is a grade II listed building.  The building was renovated by Kagyu Samye Dzong, Tibetan Buddhist Centre who obtained a five-year lease in 2005. They opened it as their London centre, called Manor Place Samye Dzong on 17 March 2007. Adjacent is the council's old recycling depot which is now closed and has been replaced by a new facility at 43 Devon Street, off Old Kent Road.

Walworth is also home to the Pullens buildings - a mixture of Victorian live/work spaces and yards. Many of the flats are one bedroom, and some of the flats still connect to the Workshops of any of the three yards (Illife Yard, Peacock Yard and one other).

Walworth also used to have a zoo, in Royal Surrey Gardens, which was visited by Queen Victoria.

Politics 

Walworth Town Hall, previously the Vestry Hall of St Mary, Newington, became the headquarters of the Metropolitan Borough of Southwark and was renamed "Southwark Town Hall" in 1900. It reverted to the name "Walworth Town Hall" when it ceased to be the local seat of government after the enlarged London Borough of Southwark was formed in 1965.

Regeneration 
Large amounts of regeneration and gentrification are occurring in Walworth, including the proposed demolition of the Elephant and Castle Shopping Centre, the newly built Strata tower, the demolition and regeneration of the Heygate and Aylesbury Estates, and redevelopment of St Mary's Churchyard as a new park. The Bakerloo Line Extension is planned to complete in 2028/29; two new stations are being built for it along Old Kent Road.

Mentions in culture 
The district of Walworth features in Charles Dickens’ Great Expectations; Mr Wemmick resides here in a small wooden cottage.

Walworth is featured in the 2016 novel by Stella Duffy, London Lies Beneath, set in 1912. It is also featured in the 2017 film The Foreigner, as the restaurant of the protagonist Ngoc Minh Quan is based in this district.

Notable residents

 Charles Babbage, polymath
 Robert Browning, poet and playwright
 Sir Charlie Chaplin, born 1889, actor and director
 Samuel Palmer, painter
 Frank Stubbs, recipient of the Victoria Cross, born 3 December 1888
 Charles Upfold, businessman
 The Walworth Jumpers, a 19th-century religious movement

Transport and locale

Nearest places
 Newington
 Southwark
 Kennington
 Peckham
 Bermondsey
 Camberwell
 Lambeth
 Borough
 Elephant and Castle

Nearest underground station
Elephant & Castle (Bakerloo and Northern lines)

Nearest National Rail station
Elephant & Castle

References

External links

Southwark Notes – whose regeneration? Regeneration and Gentrification in Southwark, South London

Areas of London
Districts of the London Borough of Southwark